Thornlie is an electoral district of the Legislative Assembly of Western Australia. It is located in Perth's southeastern suburbs, and is named after the suburb of Thornlie.

Thornlie was first created for the 1989 state election. It was abolished in a redistribution prior to the 2005 election, but was recreated for the 2017 election to replace the abolished seat of Gosnells. When Thornlie recreated it had a notional 1.8-point majority for the Labor Party (based on the results of the 2013 election), and was considered a marginal seat.

History
Thornlie was first created for the 1989 state election. It largely replaced the abolished district of Gosnells and was won by incumbent Gosnells MP Yvonne Henderson. It was held at all times by the Labor Party.

The district was abolished ahead of the 2005 state election. At that time, it included the entirety of the suburbs of Thornlie and Langford as well as parts of the suburbs of Canning Vale, Ferndale, Kenwick, Lynwood and Maddington. Its territory was divided between the existing districts of Riverton and Southern River, as well as the new district of Kenwick. Sitting MP Sheila McHale contested and won the seat of Kenwick.

Upon its recreation prior to the 2017 state election, Thornlie had a notional 1.8-point majority for the Labor Party. Incumbent Gosnells MP Chris Tallentire contested Thornlie and won the seat with a 14% swing in his favour, thus making Thornlie a safe Labor seat.

Members for Thornlie

Election results

References

External links
 

Electoral districts of Western Australia
1989 establishments in Australia
Constituencies established in 1989